Edward Kenna, VC (6 July 1919 – 8 July 2009) was an Australian soldier and recipient of the Victoria Cross, the highest decoration for gallantry "in the face of the enemy" that can be awarded to members of the British and Commonwealth armed forces. Before his death, he was the last surviving Australian to have been awarded a Victoria Cross during the Second World War.

Second World War
Kenna served in the Citizen Military Forces from August 1940 and was allotted service number V55955. In December 1941, the Citizens Military Force was called up for full-time service for the duration of the war. In June 1942, Kenna volunteered for the Second Australian Imperial Force and was allotted new service number VX102142. He served in the 23rd/21st Battalion in Victoria and later in the Darwin area. In June 1943, his unit returned to Victoria before being sent to Queensland. At this point, the unit was disbanded and its members allotted as reinforcements to other units. Kenna was assigned to the 2/4th Battalion and embarked for New Guinea in October 1944.

Victoria Cross action
The citation for his VC was gazetted on 6 September 1945, and read:

Three weeks later he was shot in the mouth and spent more than a year in hospital before being discharged from the AIF in December 1946. The following year he married Marjorie Rushberry, a nurse who had cared for him at Heidelberg Military Hospital.

Interviewed about his VC action for the Australians at War Film Archive in 2002, Kenna said:

Later life
After his discharge from hospital, Kenna returned to Hamilton, Victoria. The people of the Hamilton district raised sufficient funds to build Kenna and his wife a house. The Kennas had four children. After the war he worked with the local council and played Australian rules football for the local team. He attended many Victoria Cross reunions in London and led the annual Anzac Day march in Melbourne. In the 1980s Kenna had his portrait painted by Sir William Dargie and in July 2000 he was featured on a postage stamp as part of an issue commemorating Australia's living Victoria Cross winners.

Before his death in 2009, two days after his 90th birthday, Kenna was the last living Australian VC recipient of the Second World War, and one of only two Australian living recipients of the Victoria Cross; the other being Keith Payne, who was awarded his VC during the Vietnam War. (Mark Donaldson, who received a Victoria Cross for Australia, was also living.)

Kenna's Victoria Cross was on display at the Australian War Memorial in Canberra for a period in 2010. His family later decided to sell his medals, including the VC, at an auction held at Dallas Brooks Hall in July 2011. Kenna's medal group was sold for a record high A$1,002,000 to an unknown buyer.

In 2013, a bronze statue of Kenna by sculptor Peter Corlett was unveiled in his hometown of Hamilton, Victoria.

References
Footnotes

Bibliography
Voices of War, editor Michael Caulfield, 2006 Hachette, Australia

External links
Who's Who in Australian Military History, Australian War Memorial
Photograph of Ted Kenna, Daily Telegraph

1919 births
2009 deaths
Military personnel from Victoria (Australia)
Australian Army soldiers
Australian World War II recipients of the Victoria Cross
People from Hamilton, Victoria
Recipients of the Centenary Medal
Hamilton Football Club players
Australian rules footballers from Victoria (Australia)
Australian Army personnel of World War II